John Joseph Sims VC (1835 – 6 December 1881) was an English recipient of the Victoria Cross, the highest and most prestigious award for gallantry in the face of the enemy that can be awarded to British and Commonwealth forces.

Details
Sims was about 19 years old, and a private in the 34th Regiment of Foot (later the Border Regiment), British Army during the Crimean War when the following deed took place for which he was awarded the VC.

On 18 June 1855 at Sebastopol, Crimea, after the regiment had retired into the trenches from the assault on the Redan, Private Sims went out under very heavy fire in broad daylight and brought in wounded soldiers outside the trenches.

Sims died of tuberculosis in the Union Workhouse, London on 6 December 1881.

References

Monuments to Courage (David Harvey, 1999)
The Register of the Victoria Cross (This England, 1997)

External links
Location of grave and VC medal (E. London)
 Profile

British recipients of the Victoria Cross
Crimean War recipients of the Victoria Cross
British Army personnel of the Crimean War
Border Regiment soldiers
People from Bloomsbury
19th-century deaths from tuberculosis
1835 births
1881 deaths
British Army recipients of the Victoria Cross
Tuberculosis deaths in England